Potassium inwardly-rectifying channel, subfamily J, member 4, also known as KCNJ4 or Kir2.3, is a human gene.

Function 

Several different potassium channels are known to be involved with electrical signaling in the nervous system. One class is activated by depolarization whereas a second class is not. The latter are referred to as inwardly rectifying K+ channels, and they have a greater tendency to allow potassium to flow into the cell rather than out of it. This asymmetry in potassium ion conductance plays a key role in the excitability of muscle cells and neurons. The protein encoded by this gene is an integral membrane protein and member of the inward rectifier potassium channel family. The encoded protein has a small unitary conductance compared to other members of this protein family. Two transcript variants encoding the same protein have been found for this gene.

Interactions 

KCNJ4 has been shown to interact with:
 CASK,
 DLG1 
 DLG4, 
 LIN7B,  and
 LIN7C.

See also
 Inward-rectifier potassium ion channel

References

Further reading

External links